The 1961 Boston College Eagles football team represented Boston College as an independent during the 1960 NCAA University Division football season. Led by Ernie Hefferle in his second and final season as head caoch, the Eagles compiled a record of 4–6. Boston College played home games at Alumni Stadium in Chestnut Hill, Massachusetts. After posting a losing record for the second consecutive year, Hefferle resigned become an assistant at Pittsburgh.

Schedule

References

Boston College
Boston College Eagles football seasons
Boston College Eagles football
1960s in Boston